Christine Citti (born 26 October 1962 in Paris) is a French actress, director and writer.

Personal life
Her brother, Marc Citti, is also actor. Her father was mayor of Ramoulu in the Loiret from 1995 to 2008.

Filmography

Actress

Director / Writer

Theatre

References

External links

French film actresses
20th-century French actresses
21st-century French actresses
Living people
1962 births
French film directors
French women film directors
French women screenwriters
French screenwriters
Place of birth missing (living people)